The 29th running of the women's Giro d'Italia, or Giro Rosa, was held from 6 to 15 July 2018. Raced over ten stages, it is considered the most prestigious stage race of the women's calendar. It was the 14th event of the 2018 UCI Women's World Tour. Two-time winner Anna van der Breggen was the defending champion. However she elected not to defend her title, choosing instead to focus on preparing for a bid to win her first title at the Road World Championships.

Teams
The 24 UCI Women's Team competing and associated dossard numbers.

Route

UCI World Tour

Attributed points

Stages

Stage 1
6 July 2018 — Verbania to Verbania, team time trial (TTT)

Stage 2
7 July 2018 — Ovada to Ovada,

Stage 3
8 July 2018 — Corbetta to Corbetta,

Stage 4
9 July 2018 — Piacenza to Piacenza,

Stage 5
10 July 2018 — Omegna to Omegna,

Stage 6
11 July 2018 — Sovico to Gerola Alta,

Stage 7
12 July 2018 — Lanzada to Lanzada, Individual Time Trial

Stage 8
13 July 2018 — San Giorgio to Breganze,

Stage 9
14 July 2018 — Tricesimo to Monte Zoncolan,

Stage 10
15 July 2018 — Cividale del Friuli to Cividale del Friuli,

Classification leadership table
In the 2018 Giro d'Italia Femminile, five different jerseys were awarded. The most important was the general classification, which was calculated by adding each cyclist's finishing times on each stage. Time bonuses were awarded to the first three finishers on all stages with the exception of the time trials: the stage winner won a ten-second bonus, with six and four seconds for the second and third riders respectively. Bonus seconds were also awarded to the first three riders at intermediate sprints; three seconds for the winner of the sprint, two seconds for the rider in second and one second for the rider in third. The rider with the least accumulated time is the race leader, identified by a pink jersey. This classification was considered the most important of the 2017 Giro d'Italia Femminile, and the winner of the classification was considered the winner of the race.

Additionally, there was a points classification, which awarded a cyclamen jersey. In the points classification, cyclists received points for finishing in the top 10 in a stage, and unlike in the points classification in the Tour de France, the winners of all stages – with the exception of the team time trial, which awarded no points towards the classification – were awarded the same number of points. For winning a stage, a rider earned 15 points, with 12 for second, 10 for third, 8 for fourth, 6 for fifth with a point fewer per place down to a single point for 10th place.

There was also a mountains classification, the leadership of which was marked by a green jersey. In the mountains classification, points towards the classification were won by reaching the top of a climb before other cyclists. Each climb was categorised as either second, or third-category, with more points available for the higher-categorised climbs; however on both categories, the top five riders were awarded points. The fourth jersey represented the young rider classification, marked by a white jersey. This was decided the same way as the general classification, but only riders born on or after 1 January 1995 were eligible to be ranked in the classification.

The fifth and final jersey represented the classification for Italian riders, marked by a blue jersey. This was decided the same way as the general classification, but only riders born in Italy were eligible to be ranked in the classification. There was also a team classification, in which the times of the best three cyclists per team on each stage were added together; the leading team at the end of the race was the team with the lowest total time. The daily team leaders wore red dossards in the following stage.

See also
 2018 in women's road cycling

Notes

External links

References

2018 UCI Women's World Tour
2018
2018 in Italian sport
Giro Rosa